Crow Hollow is a 1952 British mystery film directed by Michael McCarthy and starring Donald Houston, Natasha Parry and Patricia Owens. It is based on the 1950 novel Crow Hollow by Dorothy Eden. In the film, newlywed Ann Amour survives a number of murder attempts, while her maid is found stabbed to death by unknown assailants. Ann is unaware of who is trying to kill her.

The film was shot at Merton Park Studios. There was also a scene shot at Gomshall and Shere railway station.

Plot
A young woman, Ann, falls in love with and marries Doctor Robert "Bob" Amour. She goes to live with him on his family estate, Crow Hollow, with his three eccentric aunts - for whom he is obliged to provide a home, as a condition of ownership of the estate.

Ann becomes increasingly concerned about incidents and about the behaviour of the three aunts and also an attractive young maid called Willow. On one occasion a large poisonous spider jumps on her from a box of delivered flowers while her hair is being made, on another she becomes suddenly and seriously ill immediately after eating some bitter tasting soup served her by Hester, one of the aunts. She becomes convinced that somebody is trying to kill her, and as her husband refuses to live anywhere else, she bribes the maid with a gift of clothes and slips out of the house with a suitcase, intending to leave by train. She is met before boarding the train by a friend, who persuades her to return home; entering her own bedroom, she finds the maid dead - stabbed in the back whilst sitting at the dressing table wearing the dress Ann had just given her.

Police come to the house and quiz Ann.  They doubt her belief that she was the intended victim because, despite the dress, she and the maid had different hair colours. An old rumour is mentioned that the maid, who had been adopted locally, was the child of a gardener at Crow Hollow. The police prohibit anybody - save Robert on professional calls - from leaving Crow Hollow while the murder is investigated.

Ann and Robert form a theory that Willow had been wearing a hat at the dressing table, concealing the colour of her hair, confirming in their minds that Ann had been the intended victim.  To reassure Ann, her friend Diana comes to stay in the house.

Opal tells Robert that there is a phone call calling him out to a medical case.  Ann realizes that the phone had not rung and stops him from leaving.  Aunt Opal tries to serve her coffee while they discuss Ann's suspicions. Ann refuses to drink it, believing it to be poisoned. Robert is about to drink it, but changes his mind.  In the subsequent argument, Opal admits that she had inadvertently killed Willow - her illegitimate daughter - meaning to kill Ann.  Her plan had been that Robert would marry Willow, keeping Crow Hollow fully in the family. Robert takes Ann from the room saying that they are going to call the police. Opal picks up the cup of poisoned coffee and drinks it. Robert says to his wife outside the door "it's better this way".

When things have settled down, Robert is about to apply for a post as a hospital doctor, somewhat distant from Crow Hollow, when Ann tears up the application, saying she is happy at Crow Hollow and wishes to stay.

Cast
 Donald Houston as Doctor Robert Amour
 Natasha Parry as Ann Amour
 Patricia Owens as Willow
 Melissa Stribling as Diana Wilson
 Esma Cannon as Aunt Judith
 Nora Nicholson as Aunt Opal
 Susan Richmond as Aunt Hester
 Meadows White as Dexter
 Penelope Munday as Cass
 Denis Webb as Detective Inspector York
 Ewen Solon as Sergeant Jenkins
 Georgie Henschel as Nurse Baxter
 Gordon Bell as Alec
 Janet Barrow as Mrs Wilson
 Norman Claridge as Hospital Doctor
 Doris Yorke as Hospital Nurse

References

External links
 
 Crow Hollow at BFI

1952 films
1950s mystery films
1950s English-language films
Films directed by Michael McCarthy
British black-and-white films
Films set in country houses
Films based on New Zealand novels
Films about marriage
Films about murder
Merton Park Studios films
Filicide in fiction